Isabel Lardizábal (born 15 February 1968) is a Honduran swimmer. She competed in two events at the 1984 Summer Olympics.

References

1968 births
Living people
Honduran female swimmers
Olympic swimmers of Honduras
Swimmers at the 1984 Summer Olympics